Donor fatigue is a phenomenon in which people no longer donate to charities, although they have in the past. On a larger scale, it can also refer to a slowness to act on the part of the international community or any other donor base in response to a humanitarian crisis or call-to-action.

Examples
TICAD was formed at a time when the international community's interest in Africa was starting to wane, and donor fatigue was setting in.
United Nations Security Council Resolution 1087: There was slow progress in the peace process, including implementing the Lusaka Protocol. The Council approved the Secretary-General Boutros Boutros-Ghali's recommendation to reduce the size of UNAVEM III during February 1997, due to donor fatigue.

See also
 AIDS fatigue, when public health messages are ignored for similar reasons
 Information fatigue
 Voter fatigue, voting apathy related to too-frequent elections

References

International relations